The 2012–13 LEB Plata season is the 13th  season of the LEB Plata, second league of the Liga Española de Baloncesto and third division of Spanish basketball. It is also known as Adecco Plata in its sponsored identity.

Competition format
Teams will play a regular season with a Round-robin tournament format. The regular season champion will promote directly to LEB Oro and the last qualified will be relegated to Liga EBA. Teams qualified from second to ninth will join the promotion playoffs. The winner will promote also to LEB Oro.

The two first qualified teams after the first half of the league will play the Copa LEB Plata.

Regular season will start in October 10.

Eligibility of players
All teams must have in their roster:
A minimum of seven players who played in Spain during three season being between 15 and 20 years old.
A maximum of two non-EU players. This players can be replaced by players from the EU or ACP countries.
A maximum of two players from the EU or ACP countries.

Teams can not sign any player after February 28, 2012.

Team information
New teams in the league:
Clínicas Rincón (relegated after the 2011–12 LEB Oro)
Cafés Aitona (promoted after the 2011–12 Liga EBA)
Palma Air Europa (promoted after the 2011–12 Liga EBA)
Amics Castelló (achieved a vacant berth in the league)
Gran Canaria 2014 B (achieved a vacant berth in the league)
CEBA Guadalajara (new creation team, achieved a vacant berth in the league)

Teams that left the league:
River Andorra (promoted to LEB Oro as 2011–12 LEB Plata champion)
Aguas de Sousas Ourense (promoted to LEB Oro as 2011–12 LEB Plata runner-up)
CB Las Rozas (will play in Primera División)
FC Barcelona Regal B (achieved one of the vacant berths in LEB Oro)
Leyma Natura Básquet Coruña (achieved one of the vacant berths in LEB Oro)
Plasencia Extremadura (will play in Liga EBA)
Tenerife Baloncesto (will play in Primera División)
Gandía Bàsquet (relegated to Liga EBA)

Regular season

League table

(C) = Copa LEB Plata champion

Results

Promotion playoffs
Teams 2nd to 9th qualify for the promotion playoffs to LEB Oro. The quarterfinals will be played in a two-legged tie, where the seeded team will play the second game at home. Semifinals and final winners, will be decided in a best-of-five series, played with 2-2-1 format.

Copa LEB Plata
At the half of the league, the two first teams in the table play the Copa LEB Plata at home of the winner of the first half season (11th round). If this team doesn't want to host the Copa LEB Plata, the second qualified can do it. If nobody wants to host it, the Federation will propose a neutral venue.

The Champion of this Cup will play the play-offs as first qualified if it finishes the league between the 2nd and the 5th qualified. The Copa LEB Plata will be played on February 2, 2012.

Teams qualified

The game

Awards

MVP Week by Week

Regular season

Playoffs

References

External links
Official website 
LEB Plata website in FEB.es

LEB Plata seasons
LEB3